Yin Xiaoyan (尹 笑言, born 28 August 1993) is a Chinese karateka. She won the silver medal in the women's 61 kg event at the 2020 Summer Olympics in Tokyo, Japan. At the 2018 World Karate Championships in Madrid, Spain, she won the silver medal in the women's kumite 61 kg event.

Career 

She won one of the bronze medals in the women's 61 kg event at the 2016 World University Karate Championships held in Braga, Portugal.

In 2018, she won the gold medal in the women's kumite 61 kg event at the Asian Games held in Jakarta, Indonesia. In the final she defeated Rozita Alipour of Iran. Four years earlier, she won one of the bronze medals in the same event at the 2014 Asian Games held in Incheon, South Korea.

She represented China at the 2020 Summer Olympics in karate. She won the silver medal in the women's 61 kg event.

Achievements

References

External links 
 
 

1993 births
Living people
Sportspeople from Henan
Chinese female karateka
Karateka at the 2014 Asian Games
Karateka at the 2018 Asian Games
Asian Games medalists in karate
Asian Games gold medalists for China
Asian Games bronze medalists for China
Medalists at the 2014 Asian Games
Medalists at the 2018 Asian Games
Karateka at the 2020 Summer Olympics
Olympic karateka of China
Medalists at the 2020 Summer Olympics
Olympic medalists in karate
Olympic silver medalists for China
21st-century Chinese women